Posevnoy is a rural locality (a settlement) in Novotikhonovskoye Rural Settlement, Staropoltavsky District, Volgograd Oblast, Russia. The population was 35 as of 2010. There are 2 streets.

Geography 
Posevnoy is located 36 km south of Staraya Poltavka (the district's administrative centre) by road. Novy Tikhonov is the nearest rural locality.

References 

Rural localities in Staropoltavsky District